Willie William Porter (born July 3, 1942 in Winston-Salem, North Carolina) is a retired professional basketball power forward who played two seasons (1967–68) in the American Basketball Association (ABA) as a member of the Oakland Oaks, Pittsburgh / Minnesota Pipers and the Houston Mavericks. He attended Tennessee State University where he was selected by the Cincinnati Royals during the 16 round of the 1965 NBA draft.

External links

1942 births
Living people
Amateur Athletic Union men's basketball players
American men's basketball players
Basketball players from Winston-Salem, North Carolina
Cincinnati Royals draft picks
Houston Mavericks players
Minnesota Pipers players
Oakland Oaks players
Pittsburgh Pipers players
Power forwards (basketball)
Tennessee State Tigers basketball players
Wilkes-Barre Barons players